Aussie Barbecue Heroes (also known as Aussie BBQ Heroes) is an Australian reality competition television series on the Seven Network. The series features nine teams competing in a series of barbecue cooking challenges for 100,000 worth of prizes. The series is hosted by television chef Ben O'Donoghue, who also acts as a judge alongside former My Kitchen Rules contestant Robert Murphy and Australasian Barbecue Alliance co-founder Jess Pryles.

Broadcast
The series premiered on 18 November 2015 and continued to air through the summer non-ratings period on the Seven Network. From the fourth episode, the series moved from Wednesday nights to Tuesdays.

Teams
Nine teams of two people with a pre-existing relationship will compete in the series.

Episodes

References

External links
 

English-language television shows
2010s Australian reality television series
Australian cooking television series
Seven Network original programming
2015 Australian television series debuts
2015 Australian television series endings
Cooking competitions in Australia
Food reality television series
Television series by Seven Productions